Mihai Beniuc (20 November 1907 – 24 June 1988) was a Romanian socialist realist poet, dramatist, and novelist. 

He was born in 1907 in Sebiș, Arad County (at the time in Austria-Hungary), and attended the Moise Nicoară High School in Arad. In 1931 he graduated from the University of Cluj, majoring in psychology, philosophy and sociology. This was reflected in his writing, particularly in his novels. At the end of World War II, he joined the Faculty of Psychology at the University of Cluj.

Beniuc was the President of the Writers' Union of Romania and, from 1955, a titular member of the Romanian Academy. After 1965 he became a professor at the University of Bucharest.

He died in 1988 in Bucharest, and is buried at the city's Evangelical Lutheran Cemetery.

Selected works

Plays
 Cântece de pierzanie, 1938
 Cântece noi, 1943
 Orașul pierdut, 1943
 Un om așteaptă răsăritul, 1946
 Mărul de lângă drum, 1954
 Steaguri, 1951
 Cântec pentru tovarășul Gheorghiu-Dej, 1951
 Partidul m-a învățat, 1954
 Trăinicie, 1956
 Azimă, 1956
 Inima bătrînului Vezuv, 1957
 Cu un ceas mai devreme, 1959

Novels
 Pe muche de cuțit, 1959
 Dispariția unui om de rând, 1963
 Explozie înăbușită, 1971

External links
 Mihai Beniuc
 Cercul poeţilor dispăruţi – Mihai Beniuc
 Biography of Mihai Beniuc

Romanian male poets
Romanian dramatists and playwrights
People from Arad County
1907 births
1988 deaths
20th-century Romanian poets
20th-century Romanian dramatists and playwrights
Romanian-language poets
Male dramatists and playwrights
Recipients of the Order of the Star of the Romanian Socialist Republic
Titular members of the Romanian Academy
20th-century Romanian male writers
Babeș-Bolyai University alumni
Romanian propagandists
Academic staff of the University of Bucharest
Academic staff of Babeș-Bolyai University